The statue of Hercules Strangling the Nemean Lion is a bronze statue located in the Piazza Ognissanti, overlooking the Arno river in Florence, region of Tuscany, Italy.

History and description
The first bronze statuettes on this subject were completed and exhibited by the Florentine sculptor Romano Romanelli in 1906-1910. Romanelli became a prominent sculptor for the Fascist administration of Benito Mussolini. In 1930, the fascist authorities removed the statue of the Venetian-Italian patriot, Daniele Manin, from the center of this piazza, where it had been placed, and installed it in the suburbs of Arcetri. In its place, the Jewish-Italian patron, Angiolo Orvieto commissioned this statue, placed here in 1937 after display at the exhibition of the Quadriennale d'Arte Nazionale in Rome. A casting of this statue was also exhibited in Berlin in 1937, where it was prominently placed at the entrance of the exhibition alongside a photograph of Mussolini and Victor Emmanuel III of Italy.

References

Monuments and memorials in Florence
Bronze sculptures in Florence
Outdoor sculptures in Florence
Fascist architecture
1937 sculptures
Sculptures of Heracles